Mouhsine Bodda (born 18 July 1997) is a Mauritanian footballer who plays as a midfielder for FC Nouadhibou and the Mauritania national team.

References

External links

1997 births
Living people
Mauritanian footballers
Mauritania international footballers
People from Nouakchott
Association football midfielders
ACS Ksar players
FC Tevragh-Zeina players
FC Nouadhibou players
2021 Africa Cup of Nations players
Mauritania A' international footballers
2022 African Nations Championship players